Train Entering the Railroad Station is one of the earliest films ever produced in the cinema of Azerbaijan directed by Azeri cinema pioneer Aleksandr Mişon. It was released in the summer of 1898.

The film was shot on 35mm.

See also
Azerbaijani films (1898–1919)

1898 films
Azerbaijani silent films
Azerbaijani black-and-white films
Rail transport films
Films of the Russian Empire